Chee is a unisex given name. Notable people with the name include:

 Chee Dodge (1860–1947), American politician
 Chee Soo (1919–1994), English writer

See also

Chee (surname)
Chet (given name), English masculine given name
Ji (Korean name), surname and given name also spelled "Chee"

Unisex given names